Sigrid Metz-Göckel (born 1940) is a German sociologist, political scientist and social psychologist who specializes in women's and gender studies as well as in educational research and didactics. She is a professor emerita at the Technical University of Dortmund. In the late 1970s, Metz-Göckel pioneered women's studies in Germany which became an established university course in Dortmund in 1971.

Early life and education
Born on 18 August 1940 in Klein Peterwitz, Upper Silesia,  Sigrid Metz-Göckel is the daughter of Franz-Josef Schneider, a schoolteacher, and his wife Helene who raised her three small children after their father died as a soldier in the Second World War. After matriculating from the Sophienschule in Hanover, Metz-Göckel read economics at the University of Mainz before studying sociology the Goethe University Frankfurt, graduating in 1966. In 1972, she completed doctoral studies in social psychology and political science at the University of Giessen, earning a Ph.D. with a dissertation titled Hochschuldidaktik zwischen Theorie und Praxis (University Didactics between Theory and Practice). Thereafter she was a research assistant at the University of Giessen and at Frankfurt's Battelle-Institut. She furthered her education with research trips to the Jagiellonian University in Kraków, Wellesley College, Massachusetts, and the University of California, Berkeley.

Career
While still in Giessen, Metz-Göckel began to take an interest in women, attending a seminar on the new women's movement in the mid-1970s. When she moved to Dortmund, she came into contact with Frauenaktion Dortmund (Dortmund Women's Movement) and organized a successful seminar together with women students. She went on to establish a number of women's groups and began looking at women scientists.

In 1976, she received a professorship at the Tecnnical University of Dortmund where she established a didactic centre focusing on women's and gender studies, heading it until 2005. In 1979, she initiated a further education course on Frauenstudien (women's studies), making it an official course of study at the university in 1981 and contributing as scientific director until 2002.

In the 1980s, together with the sociologist Ursula Müller, she conducted a study on men titled Der Mann. Eine repräsentative Untersuchung über die Lebenssituation und das Frauenbild 20- bis 50-jähriger Männer (Man: A representative study of the situation in life and the image of women among 20- to 50-year-old men), focusing on the emancipation of men and how they viewed women.

Awards
In 1998, Metz-Göckel was honoured with the Cross of the Order of Merit of the Federal Republic of Germany.

References

1940 births
Living people
People from Racibórz County
People from Dortmund
Gender studies academics
German sociologists
German women sociologists
German political scientists
Academic staff of the Technical University of Dortmund
Recipients of the Cross of the Order of Merit of the Federal Republic of Germany